Jubilation is the tenth and final studio album by Canadian/American rock group the Band. Recorded in the spring of 1998 in Levon Helm's home studio in Woodstock, New York, it was released on September 15, 1998. For the first time since the group reformed without guitarist and songwriter Robbie Robertson, there were more originals than covers. Songs include "Last Train to Memphis", featuring guest guitarist Eric Clapton, Garth Hudson's solo instrumental closer "French Girls", Rick Danko's "High Cotton" and the ode to Ronnie Hawkins, "White Cadillac".

On only one track, "If I Should Fail", do all six group members appear. Helm and Danko are missing from one track each, guitarist Jim Weider is missing from two. Richard Bell is replaced by producer/engineer Aaron Hurwitz on piano and keyboards for much of the album (Bell appears on just three tracks). Hudson and drummer-percussionist Randy Ciarlante are on every track. Friends and family abounded to help out.

A limited pressing of the album was released in September 1998 on purple marble vinyl exclusively through the now-defunct site In the Studio. The album cover is by Illinois folk artist George Colin.

This is the only album released by the Band to include no contributions from Richard Manuel. In an August 1998 web interview, the group revealed they were already working on a follow-up that has not been released.

Track listing

Limited edition vinyl pressing

Personnel
The Band
Rick Danko – acoustic and electric bass guitars, double bass, acoustic guitar, lead and backing vocals
Levon Helm – drums, percussion, harmonica, mandolin, acoustic guitar, lead and backing vocals
Garth Hudson – keyboards, organ, accordion, piano, synthesizers, vocoder, soprano, alto and tenor saxophones, bells
Randy Ciarlante – drums, percussion, backing and lead vocals
Jim Weider – guitars, mandolin, dobro
Richard Bell – piano, accordion

Additional personnel
Aaron Professor Louie Hurwitz – producer, engineer, piano, organ, accordion, backing vocals
Tom Malone – trombone, trumpet, tenor and baritone saxophone
Eric Clapton – guitars
John Hiatt – high-string guitar, vocals
Tom Pacheco – guitar
Bobby Charles – percussion, backing vocals
Marie Spinosa – percussion, backing vocals
Marty Grebb – keyboards, backing vocals
Jim Eppard – tenor guitar, mandolin
Mike Dunn – bass guitar
Kevin Doherty – backing vocals
Amy Helm – backing vocals
Maud Hudson – backing vocals

Track-by-track personnel 
"Book Faded Brown"
 Rick Danko – lead vocals, string bass, acoustic guitar, backing vocals
 Jim Weider – acoustic guitar
 Garth Hudson – accordion
 Aaron Hurwitz – piano, Hammond organ
 Randy Ciarlante – drums, backing vocals
 Maud Hudson – backing vocals
 Marie Spinosa – backing vocals

"Don't Wait"
 Levon Helm – lead vocals, acoustic guitar, harmonica, mandolin
 Jim Weider – acoustic Dobro
 Garth Hudson – piano
 Aaron Hurwitz – accordion
 Rick Danko – string bass, backing vocals
 Randy Ciarlante – drums, backing vocals
 Marie Spinosa – backing vocals

"Last Train to Memphis"
 Levon Helm – lead vocals, triangle, acoustic guitar, harmonica, mandolin, drums
 Jim Weider – electric guitar
 Eric Clapton – lead guitar, rhythm guitar
 Garth Hudson – accordion, piano, tenor saxophone
 Rick Dank – string bass, backing vocals
 Randy Ciarlante – drums, percussion, backing vocals
 Marie Spinosa – percussion, backing vocals
 Aaron Hurwitz – backing vocals

"High Cotton"
 Rick Danko – lead vocals, string bass, acoustic guitar
 Tom Pacheco – acoustic guitar
 Levon Helm – mandolin, harmonica
 Garth Hudson – synthesizers, soprano and tenor saxophones
 Aaron Hurwitz – piano
 Randy Ciarlante – drums, backing vocals
 Marie Spinosa – backing vocals
 Kevin Doherty – backing vocals

"Kentucky Downpour"
 Levon Helm – lead vocals, drums
 Rick Danko – harmony vocals
 Garth Hudson – tenor sax
 Tom Malone – baritone and tenor saxophones, trumpet, trombone
 Jim Weider – acoustic Dobro guitar
 Aaron Hurwitz – Hammond organ
 Richard Bell – piano
 Mike Dunn – electric bass
 Randy Ciarlante – percussion, backing vocals
 Marie Spinosa – percussion, backing vocals
 Amy Helm – backing vocals

"Bound by Love"
 Rick Danko – lead vocals, string bass, acoustic guitar
 John Hiatt – lead vocals, high string guitar
 Levon Helm – mandolin
 Garth Hudson – accordion
 Aaron Hurwitz – piano, backing vocals
 Randy Ciarlante – drums, backing vocals
 Maud Hudson – backing vocals
 Marie Spinosa – backing vocals

"White Cadillac (Ode to Ronnie Hawkins)"
 Randy Ciarlante – lead vocals
 Rick Danko – harmony vocals
 Jim Eppard – tenor guitar
 Jim Weider – electric guitar
 Aaron Hurwitz – accordion, backing vocals
 Richard Bell – piano, accordion
 Mike Dunn – string bass
 Levon Helm – drums, triangle, mandolin
 Garth Hudson – whistle, siren, shaker
 Marie Spinosa – backing vocals

"If I Should Fail"
 Rick Danko – lead vocals, string bass, acoustic guitar, backing vocals
 Levon Helm – acoustic rhythm guitar, harmonica
 Jim Weider – acoustic Dobro, mandolin
 Garth Hudson – synthesizer
 Richard Bell – Hammond organ
 Aaron Hurwitz – piano, accordion
 Randy Ciarlante – drums, percussion
 Marie Spinosa – backing vocals

"Spirit of the Dance"
 Rick Danko – lead vocals, electric bass, backing vocals
 Randy Ciarlante – lead vocals, percussion, backing vocals
 Tom Malone – baritone and tenor saxophones, trumpet, trombone
 Jim Weider – Dobro, acoustic guitar solo
 Jim Eppard – mandolin
 Garth Hudson – piano, vocoder
 Aaron Hurwitz – accordion
 Levon Helm – drums
 Marie Spinosa – percussion, backing vocals

"You See Me"
 Levon Helm – lead vocals, drums, harmonica
 Garth Hudson – organ, tenor and soprano saxophones
 Jim Weider – electric guitar
 Mike Dunn – electric bass
 Tom Malone – baritone and tenor saxophones, trumpet, trombone
 Aaron Hurwitz – piano, backing vocals
 Marie Spinosa – backing vocals
 Randy Ciarlante – backing vocals

"French Girls"
 Garth Hudson – synthesizers, accordion, bells, tenor and soprano saxophones

References

1998 albums
The Band albums